Skylanders Academy is a computer-animated streaming television series produced by TeamTO and Activision Blizzard Studios based on the Skylanders series. The first season debuted on Netflix on October 28, 2016. A trailer for the series debuted on October 12, 2016. The second season was released on October 6, 2017 and the third and final season was released on September 28, 2018.

On April 30, 2019, the series was confirmed to have concluded.

Plot
In the world of Skylands, Spyro the Dragon, Stealth Elf, and Eruptor are new graduates at Skylanders Academy. Under the teachings of Master Eon and Jet-Vac, the three of them will learn what it means to be a Skylander while fighting the evil Kaos and other villains of Skylands.

Voice cast

Main

Recurring

Guest
 Tara Strong as Coco Bandicoot
 DanTDM as Cy (Water Imaginator)
 Fred Willard as Mabu Race Announcer

Episodes

Season 1 (2016)

Season 2 (2017)

Season 3 (2018)

Production
At an Investor Day presentation on November 6, 2015, Activision Blizzard announced the formation of Activision Blizzard Studios, a film production subsidiary dedicated to creating original films and television series. Headed by former The Walt Disney Company executive Nick van Dyk, Activision Blizzard Studios would look to produce and adapting Skylanders into a film and television series; the latter being called Skylanders Academy, which started airing on October 28, 2016 on Netflix.

The series is a spin-off, said to be separate from the storyline of the games with no direct tie-ins to sequels. In addition, the different voice cast is made to give the show its own separate identity. However, despite the changes, Richard Horvitz, Jonny Rees, Bobcat Goldthwait, Billy West, Fred Tatasciore, and Courtenay Taylor are the only actors from the games to reprise their roles as Kaos, Jet-Vac, Pop Fizz, Food Fight, Snap Shot, and Hex respectively. Patrick Warburton would later go on to reprise his role as Captain Flynn in the third season. Showrunner Eric Rogers provided the voice of Crash Bandicoot due to his creative partners being impressed on giving the character an Australian Accent during a temp-track he recorded.

The trailer for the second season was released on September 19, 2017. Mark Hamill was originally considered to reprise his role as Malefor, a character that originated from The Legend of Spyro: Dawn of the Dragon, but was unable to as he was busy filming Star Wars: The Last Jedi. Flynn, Sal, Fiesta, Tree Rex, Jawbreaker, The Gulper and Dr. Krankcase were characters planned to appear in the second season, but were cut due to budget reasons. Flynn himself, would later go on to appear in the following season a year later.

The trailer for the third season was released on September 18, 2018. During production of Season three, Eric Rogers stepped down as showrunner and was replaced by both Clayton Sakoda and Ian Weinreich in his absence, and due to his departure, Rogers was unable to reprise Crash Bandicoot and was later replaced by Rhys Darby.

Reception

Awards and nominations

References

External links
Skylanders Academy official website
Skylanders Academy on Netflix

2010s American animated television series
2016 American television series debuts
2018 American television series endings
2010s French animated television series
2016 French television series debuts
2018 French television series endings
Works based on Activision video games
Animated series based on video games
English-language Netflix original programming
Academy
Netflix children's programming
Animated television series by Netflix
American children's animated action television series
American children's animated adventure television series
American children's animated comedy television series
American children's animated fantasy television series
French children's animated action television series
French children's animated adventure television series
French children's animated comedy television series
French children's animated fantasy television series
American computer-animated television series
French computer-animated television series
Animated television series about dragons